Golden Years (also referred to as Stephen King's Golden Years)  is an American television science fiction thriller miniseries that aired in seven parts on CBS from July 16 to August 22, 1991 as a part of its 1991 schedule.

Plot
Harlan Williams, an elderly janitor, is caught up in an explosion at the top-secret laboratory where he works. After surviving but discovering he is now "aging" in reverse, he ends up on the run from an operative of "The Shop".

Cast
All episodes
 Keith Szarabajka as Harlan Williams
 Felicity Huffman as Terry Spann
 Frances Sternhagen as Gina Williams
 Ed Lauter as Gen. Louis Crewes
 R. D. Call as Jude Andrews
 Bill Raymond as Dr. Richard X. Toddhunter

Six or fewer appearances
 Stephen Root as Maj. Moreland
 Philip Lenkowsky as Billy Delois
 Tim Guinee as Fredericks
 Graham Paul as Rick Haverford
 Erik King as Burton
 John Rothman as Dr. Ackerman
 Harriet Sansom Harris as Francie Williams
 Matt Malloy as Redding
 Margo Martindale as Thelma
 Stephen King (cameo/episode 5) as a bus driver

Production
King called Golden Years a "novel for television"; it originated as an idea for a novel that sat in his notebook for years. He "wrote the first five episodes and outlined the last two." King credited Twin Peaks for making it possible for Golden Years to be produced:
"Up until Twin Peaks came on, the only sort of continuing drama that TV understood was soap opera, Dallas, Knots Landing, that sort of thing. To some degree David Lynch gave them that. But he turned the whole idea of that continuing soap opera inside out like a sock. If you think of Twin Peaks as a man, it's a man in delirium, a man spouting stream-of-consciousness stuff. Golden Years is like Twin Peaks without the delirium."

The miniseries was intended to lead into a regular series, and therefore ended on a cliffhanger. CBS, however, decided not to pick up the option on the full series, and it was never realized. King asked for four hours of airtime in the following spring to finish the story, but CBS denied him this as well. The home video version changes the last few minutes of the final episode to give the story an optimistic ending.

References

External links

1990s American television miniseries
1991 American television series debuts
1991 American television series endings
Television shows written by Stephen King
Television shows based on works by Stephen King
Television series by CBS Studios
CBS original programming